Malchow is a town in Mecklenburg-Vorpommern, Germany.

Malchow may also refer to:

People with the surname
Herman Malchow, American politician
Harold C. Malchow, American politician
Tom Malchow, American swimmer
Joseph Malchow, American entrepreneur

Places
Malchow (Amt), a collective municipality of Mecklenburg-Vorpommern, Germany
Malchow (Berlin), a locality in the borough of Lichtenberg, Berlin
Stadtrandsiedlung Malchow, a locality in the borough of Pankow, Berlin